The continuative aspect (abbreviated  or ) is a grammatical aspect representing actions that are 'still' happening. English does not mark the continuative explicitly but instead uses an adverb such as still.

Ganda uses the prefix -kya- to mark the continuative aspect. For example, nsoma (unmarked for aspect) means 'I'm reading', while nkyasoma (continuative) means 'I'm still reading'.

Similarly, Pipil marks the continuative aspect using the clitic -(y)uk-. For instance, nitakwa means 'I am eating' or 'I eat', while nitakwayuk (continuative) means 'I'm still eating'.

Grammatical aspects